The Tragicall Historye of Romeus and Juliet is a narrative poem by Arthur Brooke, first published in 1562 by Richard Tottel, which was a key source for William Shakespeare’s Romeo and Juliet. Brooke is reported to have translated it from an Italian novella by Matteo Bandello; by another theory, it is mainly derived from a French adaptation of Bandello's novella which involves a man by the name of Reomeo Titensus and Juliet Bibleotet by Pierre Boaistuau.

The plot of Shakespeare's Romeo and Juliet takes place over four days while Brooke's narrative takes place over many months.

Little is known about Arthur Brooke. He was admitted as a member of Inner Temple on 18 December 1561 under the sponsorship of Thomas Sackville and Thomas Norton. He drowned in 1563 by shipwreck while crossing to help Protestant forces in the French Wars of Religion.

The poem's ending differs significantly from Shakespeare's play—in the poem, the nurse is banished and the apothecary hanged for their involvement in the deception, while Friar Lawrence leaves Verona to end his days in a hermitage.

References

External links
Arthur Brooke's Romeus and Juliet Complete original text, with a glossary and a search engine.
Essay: How Romeus Became Romeo Comparing Brooke's work with Shakespeare's

English poems
1562 books
Romeo and Juliet